American Journal of Distance Education (AJDE) is an academic journal focusing on the uses of Internet in distance education (e-learning, distributed learning, asynchronous learning and blended learning) in Americas.

According to the journal website, it contents include:
 "building and sustaining effective delivery systems;
 course design and application of instructional design theories
 facilitating interaction between students and with instructors;
 factors influencing student achievement and satisfaction;
 the changing roles of faculty and changes in institutional culture;
 administrative and policy issues including cost-effectiveness and copyright."

The audience of AJDE includes: "teachers in primary education, secondary education and higher education, trainers in corporate, military, and professional fields; adult educators; researchers; and other specialists in education, training, and communications."

Publication information
 From 1987 until 2001 AJDE was published at the Pennsylvania State University and is now published by Routledge

External links
 

Distance education journals
Routledge academic journals
Publications established in 1987
Quarterly journals